The Triumph Tiger 1050 is a continuation of the Triumph Tiger motorcycle model line from the Triumph Tiger 955i produced in Hinckley, England by Triumph Motorcycles. The model name is derived from Triumph's long history of sporting motorcycles of both single and twin cylinder design and of previous capacities from 350 cc to 750 cc. This model has a three-cylinder engine derived from the previous dual purpose Tiger. The Tiger 1050 shifts more towards the sport/street-oriented use from previous models. This is most easily seen with the use of cast 17-inch wheels.  Radial front brakes (four-piston) and floating front discs are also indicators of the more sport orientated role of the Tiger 1050.

First launched in 2007, it was released to the press the previous November. Also available with ABS.

In 2009, Triumph introduced a special edition version that includes ABS brakes, the two-box pannier kit and handguards.

Tiger Models Overview

See also
Tiger 900
List of Triumph motorcycles

References

External links

Official Tiger page at Triumph UK

Tiger 1050
Standard motorcycles
Motorcycles introduced in 2007

fr:Triumph Tiger#Tiger 1050